Fillmore Glen State Park is a  state park located in the Finger Lakes region of New York adjacent to the Village of Moravia in Cayuga County.

Park description
The primary attractions of the park are the hiking trails with views of a stream and five waterfalls, in addition to the swimming pond, made by damming the stream.

The park offers swimming, picnic tables and pavilions, cabins, a campground with 60 tent and trailer sites, hunting and fishing, hiking, a playground, snowmobiling, and cross-country skiing.

See also
List of New York state parks

References

External links
New York State Parks: Fillmore Glen State Park
Fillmore Glen State Park trail map

State parks of New York (state)
Glens of the United States
Buildings and monuments honoring American presidents in the United States
Presidential homes in the United States
Parks in Cayuga County, New York